Hazfi Cup (Jām-e Hazfi) is the Iranian football knockout cup competition, run by the Iranian Football Federation.

The Iranian football league was not held during the 1980s, hence the winner of Hazfi Cup represented Iran in the Asian Club Championship. After the revive of the league system, the champion of Iranian league qualified for Asian Club Championship and the winner of Hazfi Cup ran for Asian Cup Winners' Cup. However, the Asian Cup Winners' Cup merged with the Asian Champions Cup in 2002–03 to form the AFC Champions League and Iran had been initially given two (and later four) slots in this competitions. The IRIFF decided to award one of Iran's AFC Champions League spots to the winner of the Hazfi Cup, and since then, the winners of Hazfi Cup have always been allocated a spot in the AFC Champions League.

The competition was founded in 1975 as Pahlavi Cup but after revolution continued as Hazfi Cup. Esteghal is the most successful club with seven titles.

Format 
The rules for the final were exactly the same as the one for the previous knockout rounds. The tie was contested over two legs with away goals deciding the winner if the two teams were level on goals after the second leg. If the teams could still not be separated at that stage, then extra time would have been played with a penalty shootout (taking place if the teams were still level after that).

Finals 

The champions are shown in Bold.

Performance by finalists 
 source: 

 Damash Gilan was formerly named Pegah Gilan in the Hazfi Cup.

Statistics

Winners by Province 
 source:

Winners by City 
 source:

Winning managers

See also 
 IPL
 Azadegan League
 Iran Football's 2nd Division
 Iran Football's 3rd Division
 Iranian Super Cup
 Iranian Futsal Super League
 Iran Futsal's 1st Division
 List of Hazfi Cup winning managers

Notes

References

External links 

List of Hazfi Cup Champions from RSSSF
 Hazfi Cup – Hailoosport.com (Arabic)
 Hazfi Cup – Hailoosport.com
Hazfi Cup summary (SOCCERWAY)(English)

 
1
Iran
Recurring sporting events established in 1975
1975 establishments in Iran